Anna Bikont (born 17 July 1954) is a Polish journalist for the Gazeta Wyborcza newspaper in Warsaw. She is the author of several books, including My z Jedwabnego (2004) about the 1941 Jedwabne pogrom, which was published in English as The Crime and the Silence: Confronting the Massacre of Jews in Wartime Jedwabne (2015). The French edition, Le crime et le silence, won the European Book Prize in 2011.

Early life and education
Bikont was born in a Polish-Jewish family in Warsaw to journalist  and Catholic-Polish writer Andrzej Kruczkowski. She has a sister, Maria Kruczkowska. Bikont was awarded an MA in psychology from Warsaw University.

Career
Bikont worked for Warsaw University until 1988. Between 1982 and 1989 she was an underground Solidarity activist. She was co-founder and editor of Tygodnik Mazowsze weekly, Poland's largest underground publication. In 1989 she became one of the founders of Gazeta Wyborcza, the first legal newspaper published outside the communist government's control. It became independent of Solidarity in 1990. She has continued to work for the paper as a senior journalist.

In response to Jan T. Gross's history of the Jedwabne massacre, Neighbors: The Destruction of the Jewish Community in Jedwabne, Poland (2001), the Polish government commissioned an investigation led by prosecutor Radosław Ignatiew for the Institute of National Remembrance (IPN). Bikont began her own journalistic investigation, interviewing numerous people in Jedwabne, including descendants of survivors and persons living in the city when Gross's book was published. She expanded her work into the fiction book My z Jedwabnego (2004, "Jedwabne: Battlefield of Memory"). 

Writer Julian Barnes, one of the judges of the 2011 European Book Prize, describes her fiction as "more than a book of memory. It is also a book about forgetting, about the pollution of memory, about the conflict between the easy, convenient truth and the awkward, harder truth. It is a work that grows from its journalistic manner and origins into the powerful writing of fiction ."

Her husband, journalist and director Piotr Bikont (1955–2017), died in a car accident in 2017.

Selected publications
Books
 Sendlerowa. W ukryciu ('Sendler: In Hiding'), Wołowiec: Wydawnictwo Czarne, 2017.
 Lawina i Kamienie ('The Avalanche and the Stones', co-authored with Joanna Szczęsna), Warsaw: Prószynski, 2006.
 My z Jedwabnego ('Jedwabne: Battlefield of Memory'), Warsaw: Prószyński, 2004.
Le crime et le silence, 2011.
 The Crime and the Silence: Confronting the Massacre of Jews in Wartime Jedwabne. New York: Farrar, Straus & Giroux, 2015.
 Pamiątkowe rupiecie. Biografia Wisławy Szymborskiej ('Dusty Keepsakes. The biography of Wisława Szymborska', co-authored with Joanna Szczęsna), Warsaw: Prószyński i S-ka, 1997.
 And I Still See Their Faces; Images of Polish Jews, (editor), 1996.
 Małe vademecum Peerelu ('The Little Vade Mecum of Living in the Polish People's Republic', co-authored with Piotr Bikont and Wojciech Cesarski), Warsaw: Agora, 1990.

Selected Essays
 „Anachnu m'Jedwabne”, in: Ha-heshbon ha-polani: Imut im Zikaron (Facing Memory: The Polish Account), ed. Miri Paz, Tel Aviv: Hakibbutz Hameuchad, 2007.
 „A Belligerent Voice in Defence of Peace, or Europeans in Wroclaw”, Edinburgh: Edinburgh Review nr 121, 2007
 „Lechosław Goździk. Il revoluzionario e il pescatore”, Roma: MicroMega 9/2006
 „L'intimidee”, in: La vie est un reportage, Paris: Les editions Noir sur Blanc, 2005
 „We of Jedwabne”, in: The Neighbors Respond: The Controversy over the Jedwabne Massacre in Poland, ed. Antony Polonsky and Joanna B. Michlic, Princeton and Oxford: Princeton University Press, 2004.
 „Ryszard Kapuscinski celebrates Herodotus” (interview with Ryszard Kapuściński), New York: Omnivore, A Journal of Writing and Visual Culture from the New York Institute for the Humanities at NYU, Autumn 2003
 „Seen from Jedwabne”, Jerusalem: Yad Vashem Studies XXX, 2004
 „Neighbours”, Index of Censorship, UK: Thanet Press, 2001

Selected awards 
 2018 – Ryszard Kapuściński Award (Sendlerowa : w ukryciu)
2015 – National Jewish Book Award in the Holocaust category for The Crime and the Silence: Confronting the Massacre of Jews in Wartime Jedwabne
 2011 – European Book Prize for Le Crime et le Silence (“My z Jedwabnego”).
 2005 – Best History Book of the Year, awarded by Polityka weekly, for “My z Jedwabnego”.
 2005 – shortlisted for the Nike Award, the Polish equivalent of the Booker Prize, for "My z Jedwabnego".
 2001 – the Grand Press prize – the most prestigious journalistic award in Poland, for articles on the crime in Jedwabne, published by Gazeta Wyborcza.

Fellowships
Cullman Fellowship, New York Public Library, New York, 2008/2009 
Visiting Fellow, The New York Institute for the Humanities at NYU, New York, January–March 2003

References

1954 births
Living people
Journalists from Warsaw
Polish women writers
20th-century Polish Jews
21st-century Polish Jews